The 2021–22 Horizon League men's basketball season began with practices in September 2021 and ended with the 2022 Horizon League men's basketball tournament in March 2022. This was the 42nd season for Horizon League men's basketball.

Head coaches

Coaching changes 

 On April 13, 2021, IUPUI announced Ball State assistant Matt Crenshaw as the team's new head coach. Previous head coach Byron Rimm II served as the team's head coach for two years while the program's search for a permanent head coach was prolonged by the COVID-19 pandemic.

Preseason

Preseason coaches poll

Preseason All-Horizon League 

Preseason Player of the Year: Antoine Davis, Detroit Mercy

Preseason watchlists 
Below is a table of notable preseason watch lists.

Rankings

Regular season

Player of the Week awards

Conference matrix

Early season tournaments 
The following table summarizes the multiple-team events (MTE) or early season tournaments in which teams from the Horizon League participated.

References 

2021–22 Horizon League men's basketball season